Goče is a village in the hills southwest of Vipava in the traditional Inner Carniola region of Slovenia. It is now generally regarded as part of the Slovenian Littoral. It includes the hamlets of Bešenca, Na Grofovem, Na Jagni, Pod Strmcem, and V Gasah.

Name
The name Goče is  derived from the personal name *Gotъ. Other Slovenian toponyms presumably based on this name are Gotenica, Gotna vas (a suburb of Novo Mesto), Gotovlje, and Gotenc. Locally, the name is pronounced Γûəče , with the adjective form γûški  and demonym Γučân .

History
Goče was very wealthy in the past; this is indicated in part by houses with dates from the 17th and 18th centuries carved into their door casings. Near Saint Andrew's Church some of the old buildings are built so close together that the streets are barely 1 m wide. Oral tradition states that the houses were built so compactly because the land belonged to the church, exempting the residents from military service.

Churches

The parish church in the settlement is dedicated to Saint Andrew and dates from 1630. It belongs to the Koper Diocese. A small church built on a hill above the village also belongs to this parish and is dedicated to Our Lady of the Snow. The bell tower contains a bell cast in Goče in 1706.

The village cemetery is south of the settlement. It has chapel dating from 1687 that is a prime example of the Karst Renaissance style. Between the church and the cemetery there is an altar-like wayside shrine from the end of the 17th century. Its relief carvings are heavily damaged.

Notable people
Notable people that were born or lived in Goče include:
Franc Ferjančič (1867–1943), writer
Alfonz Furlan (1856–1932), local historian and religious writer
Ivan Mercina (1851–1940), campanologist and composer

References

External links
Goče on Geopedia

Populated places in the Municipality of Vipava